The striated surgeonfish, Ctenochaetus striatus, is a species of marine fish in the family Acanthuridae.

The striated surgeonfish can reach a maximum size of 24 cm in length, but its common size is observed to be around 18 cm.

The striated surgeonfish is one of the few herbivorous fishes which are occasionally toxic. Ciguatera poisoning is caused by the accumulation of a toxin produced by certain microscopic dinoflagellates which it ingests while feeding on algae. If a contaminated fish is eaten by humans, the concentrated poison contained within its tissues causes neurological damage that can be fatal.

It occasionally makes its way into the aquarium trade.

When compared to other coral-fish larvae, the striated surgeonfish uniquely exhibits a non-selective attraction to noisy areas, where others are repelled or are selectively attracted to specific sounds.

References

External links
 

Acanthuridae
Fish described in 1825